Kithina is a village located in Eastern Province, Kenya, near the town of Machakos.

Kithina has around 600 inhabitants, a secondary school with around 500 students, two primary schools each with more than 300 students, two nursery schools and five churches.

References

Sources
Geographic.org; Kithina, Kenya

Populated places in Eastern Province (Kenya)